The Nuragic and Contemporary Art Museum, also known as "Betile", is a planned contemporary art museum in Cagliari, Sardinia, Italy, designed by Zaha Hadid. Work is in progress to build it on the Sant'Elia promenade, near to the Stadio Sant'Elia football stadium.

The museum will be dedicated to Nuragic and contemporary art. Works from Sardinia and the Mediterranean will be displayed.

References

External links
Domusweb

Contemporary art galleries in Italy
Buildings and structures in Cagliari
Zaha Hadid buildings
Museums in Sardinia
Planned new art museums and galleries
Proposed buildings and structures in Italy